The following highways are numbered 11A:

Canada 
 Ontario Highway 11A - two former stretches of highway within Ontario.

India
  National Highway 11A (India)

United States
 New Hampshire Route 11A
 New York State Route 11A
 County Route 11A (Otsego County, New York)
 County Route 11A (Sullivan County, New York)
 Oklahoma State Highway 11A